FK Palilulac Beograd is a football club based in Krnjača, Belgrade, Serbia. They compete in the Belgrade Inter-Municipal League, the sixth tier of the national league system.

History
The club was founded as BSK Zlatibor on 15 June 1924. The name was later changed to FK Palilulac in 1928. After the conclusion of World War II, the club was reactivated in 1948, keeping its previous name.

Following the breakup of Yugoslavia, the club won the Belgrade Zone League in the 1994–95 season and subsequently the Serbian League Belgrade in the inaugural 1995–96 season, thus reaching the Second League of FR Yugoslavia. They finished second in their debut appearance and narrowly missed promotion to the top flight (I/B League), losing to Spartak Subotica in the playoffs. After spending three more years in the second tier, the club finished bottom of the table in the 1999–2000 season (Group North) and suffered relegation back to the Serbian League Belgrade. They were relegated to the fourth tier in 2002.

After spending four years in the Belgrade Zone League, the club won the fourth-tier competition in the 2005–06 campaign, thus earning promotion to the Serbian League Belgrade. They spent the next five seasons in the third tier, before being relegated back to the Belgrade Zone League. On 15 August 2014, just one day ahead of the start of the new season, it was announced that the club had withdrawn from the league.

In the 2019–20 season, after five years of hiatus, the club started competing in the Belgrade Inter-Municipal League, the sixth level of Serbian football.

Honours
Serbian League Belgrade (Tier 3)
 1995–96
Belgrade Zone League (Tier 4)
 1994–95, 2005–06

Seasons

Notable players
This is a list of players who have played at full international level.
  Aleksandar Jovanović
  Nikoslav Bjegović
For a list of all FK Palilulac Beograd players with a Wikipedia article, see :Category:FK Palilulac Beograd players.

Managerial history

References

External links
 Club page at Srbijasport

1924 establishments in Serbia
Association football clubs established in 1924
Football clubs in Serbia
Football clubs in Belgrade
Palilula, Belgrade